The 1973 Pittsburgh Steelers season was the team's 41st season in the National Football League. The team finished second in the AFC Central division, but qualified for the postseason for the second consecutive season. The Steelers got off to a terrific start winning eight of their first nine games. However, a costly three game losing streak would put their playoff hopes in jeopardy. The Steelers would recover to win their last two games, but had to settle for a Wild Card berth with a 10–4 record. The Steelers would lose in the playoffs to the Oakland Raiders 33–14 in Oakland.

The 1973 Steelers' pass defense is arguably the greatest in the history of the NFL. Their defensive passer rating—the quarterback passer rating of all opposing quarterbacks throughout the season—was 33.1, an NFL record for the Super Bowl era.

According to Cold Hard Football Facts:
Pittsburgh's pass-defense numbers that year were stunning. Opposing passers compiled the following stat-line:
164 of 359 (45.7%) for 1,923 yards, 5.36 [yards-per-attempt], 11 [touchdowns] and 37 [interceptions]

The figure that leaps screaming off the sheet is the amazing 37 picks in 14 games. The 2009 Jets, by comparison, allowed a puny 8 TDs in 16 games, but hauled in just 17 picks.
 
Pittsburgh's all-time best pass defense was an equal-opportunity unit: Mike Wagner led the team with 8 INT, but 10 other guys recorded at least one pick. Amazing. Eleven defenders boasted at least one INT for Pittsburgh that season. The entire starting secondary recorded 24 picks alone, and Hall of Fame cornerback Mel Blount was last on the list: Wagner (8), safety Glen Edwards (6), cornerback John Rowser (6) and Blount (4).

The campaign was chronicled in Roy Blount Jr.'s 1974 book About Three Bricks Shy of a Load. The source of its title was Craig Hanneman whose endearing description of himself and his teammates after the regular season away victory over the Oakland Raiders was "We’re all about three bricks shy of a load."

Personnel

Staff

Roster

Offseason

NFL Draft

Preseason

Game summaries

Regular season

Game summaries

Week 1

Week 2

Week 3

Week 4  

Johnny Unitas playing for San Diego is knocked out of the game after completing only 3 of 15 passes for 24 yards and three interceptions.

Week 5

Week 6

Week 7 vs Bengals

Week 8 vs Washington Redskins 

Joe Gilliam makes Monday Night Football debut

Week 9 at Raiders

Week 10 vs Broncos

Week 11

Game summary 

Scoring drives:

 Pittsburgh – Shanklin 9 pass from Gilliam (Gerela kick) – Steelers 7–0
 Cleveland – Phipps 1 run (Cockroft kick) – Tie 7–7
 Cleveland – Pruitt 15 pass from Phipps (Cockroft kick) – Browns 14-7
 Pittsburgh – FG Gerela 24 – Browns 14-10
 Pittsburgh – FG Gerela 14 – Browns 14-13
 Pittsburgh – FG Gerela 20 – Steelers 16–14
 Cleveland – Pruitt 19 run (Cockroft kick) – Browns 21–16

Week 12 (Monday December 3, 1973): at Miami Dolphins

Game summary 

Scoring drives:

 Miami – Anderson 27 interception return (Yepremian kick) – Dolphins 7–0
 Miami – FG Yepremian 28 – Dolphins 10–0
 Miami – FG Yepremian 46 – Dolphins 13–0 
 Miami – Mandich 2 pass from Griese (Yepremian kick) – Dolphins 20–0
 Miami – Anderson 38 interception return (Yepremian kick) – Dolphins 27–0
 Pittsburgh – FG Gerela 37 – Dolphins 27–3
 Miami – FG Yepremian 14 – Dolphins 30–3
 Pittsburgh – P. Pearson 5 pass from Bradshaw (Gerela kick) – Dolphins 30–10
 Pittsburgh – Harris 21 run (Gerela kick) – Dolphins 30–17
 Pittsburgh – B. Pearson 17 pass from Bradshaw (Gerela kick) – Dolphins 30–24
 Pittsburgh – Safety, White tackled Griese in end zone – Dolphins 30–26

Week 13

Game summary 

Scoring drives:

 Pittsburgh – FG Gerela 49 – Steelers 3–0
 Houston – Alston 11 pass from Pastorini (Butler kick) – Oilers 7–3
 Pittsburgh – B. Pearson 15 pass from Bradshaw (Gerela kick) – Steelers 10–7
 Pittsburgh – Steve Davis 3 pass from Bradshaw (Gerela kick) – Steelers 17–7
 Pittsburgh – FG Gerela 31 – Steelers 20–7
 Pittsburgh – Ham recovered fumble in end zone (Gerela kick) – Steelers 27–7
 Pittsburgh – FG Gerela 20 – Steelers 30–7
 Pittsburgh – FG Gerela 42 – Steelers 33–7

Week 14

Game summary 
John Brodie's number 12 was retired prior to game.

Scoring drives:

 Pittsburgh – Rowser 71 interception return (Gerela kick) – Steelers 7–0
 San Francisco – Hall recovered blocked punt in end zone (Gossett kick) – Tie 7–7
 Pittsburgh – P. Pearson 1 run (Gerela kick) – Steelers 14–7
 Pittsburgh – FG Gerela 27 – Steelers 17–7
 Pittsburgh – FG Gerela 27 – Steelers 20–7
 Pittsburgh – Lewis 50 pass from Bradshaw (Gerela kick) – Steelers 27–7
 Pittsburgh – FG Gerela 35 – Steelers 30–7
 Pittsburgh – Steve Davis 1 run (Gerela kick) – Steelers 37–7
 San Francisco – Atkins 3 run (Gossett kick) – Steelers 37–14

Standings

Postseason

AFC Divisional: @ Oakland Raiders 

References:

Scoring Drives 

 Oakland – Hubbard 1 run (Blanda kick) – Raiders 7–0
 Oakland – FG Blanda 25 – Raiders 10–0
 Pittsburgh – B. Pearson 4 pass from Bradshaw (Gerela kick) – Raiders 10–7
 Oakland – FG Blanda 31 – Raiders 13–7
 Oakland – FG Blanda 22 – Raiders 16–7
 Oakland – Brown 54 interception return (Blanda kick) – Raiders 23–7
 Oakland – FG Blanda 10 – Raiders 26–7
 Pittsburgh – Lewis 26 pass from Bradshaw (Gerela kick) – Raiders 26–14
 Oakland – Hubbard 1 run (Blanda kick) – Raiders 33–14

References

External links
 1973 Pittsburgh Steelers season at Profootballreference.com 
 1973 Pittsburgh Steelers season statistics at jt-sw.com 

Pittsburgh Steelers seasons
Pittsburgh Steelers
Pittsburgh Steel